The plumbeous-backed thrush (Turdus reevei) is a species of bird in the family Turdidae. It is found in Ecuador and Peru. Its natural habitats are subtropical or tropical dry forests, subtropical or tropical moist lowland forests, and subtropical or tropical moist montane forests.

References

plumbeous-backed thrush
Birds of Ecuador
Birds of Peru
Birds of the Tumbes-Chocó-Magdalena
plumbeous-backed thrush
Taxonomy articles created by Polbot